Parametaria is a genus of sea snails, marine gastropod mollusks in the family Columbellidae, the dove snails.

Species
Species within the genus Parametaria include:
 Parametaria barbieri K. Monsecour & D. Monsecour, 2019
 Parametaria dupontii Kiener, 1845
 Parametaria epamella P. L. Duclos, 1840 
 † Parametaria islahispaniolae (Maury, 1917) 
 Parametaria macrostoma (Reeve, 1859) 
Species brought into synonymy
 Parametaria ledaluciae Rios & Tostes, 1981: synonym of Eurypyrene ledaluciae (Rios & Tostes, 1981)
 Parametaria philippinarum L. A. Reeve, 1843: synonym of Parametaria epamella (Duclos, 1840)

References

External links
 Reeve, L. A. (1859). Monograph of the genus Meta. In: Conchologia Iconica, or, illustrations of the shells of molluscous animals, vol. 11, pl. 1 and unpaginated text. L. Reeve & Co., London.
 Dall, W. H. (1916). Notes on West American Columbellidae. The Nautilus. 30(3): 25-29
 Jung, P. (1994). Neogene Paleontology in the Northern Dominican Republic 15. The Genera Columbella, Eurypyrene, Parametaria, Conella, Nitidella, and Metulella (Gastropoda: Columbellidae). Bulletins of American Paleontology. 106(344):1-45
 de Maintenon M. J. (2005). "Phylogenetic relationships of the tropical American columbellid taxa Conella, Eurypyrene, and Parametaria (Gastropoda: Neogastropoda)". Journal of Paleontology 79(3): 497-508. .

Columbellidae